Alyaksey Khaletski (born 19 June 1984 in Minsk) is a Belarusian football coach and former player (defender).

Honours
BATE Borisov
Belarusian Premier League champion: 2006
Belarusian Cup winner: 2005–06

External links
 

1984 births
Living people
Belarusian footballers
Belarusian expatriate footballers
Expatriate footballers in Uzbekistan
FC BATE Borisov players
FC Belshina Bobruisk players
FC Torpedo-BelAZ Zhodino players
FC Vitebsk players
FC Energetik-BGU Minsk players
FC Slutsk players
FC Granit Mikashevichi players
FC Gorodeya players
Association football defenders